Ferdinand of Fürstenberg died as a child. He was the son of Frederick Rudolf of Fürstenberg and Anna Magdalena of Hanau-Lichtenberg.

Fürstenberg (princely family)
German princes
Royalty and nobility who died as children